Raffaella Maria Roberta Pelloni (18 June 1943 – 5 July 2021), better known as Raffaella Carrà, was an Italian singer, dancer, television presenter, actress and model.

She was well known in Europe and Latin America as a result of her many television shows and records. Carrà is the interpreter of very popular songs such as A far l'amore comincia tu from her album Forte forte forte.

Early life
Carrà was born on 18 June 1943 in Bologna to Raffaele Pelloni and Angela Iris Dell'Utri (of Sicilian ancestry) and had a brother named Enzo (dead in 2001)  her parents, however, separated shortly after the wedding and Carrà spent most of her childhood between her mother's bar and the ice cream shop in Bellaria – Igea Marina. At the latter establishment, she grew up watching the television programme Il Musichiere, learning by heart titles, ballets, and refrains of the songs.

When she was only eight years old, she left the Romagna Riviera to continue her studies directly in Rome at the National Academy of Dance. At the age of 14 she dropped out of ballet classes. In 1952 she began her studies at the Centro Sperimentale di Cinematografia until she graduated in 1960.

Career

1950s and 1960s: youth, early career and Hollywood

At the age of 9, while walking with her mother in Rome and through a family friend, she met the director Mario Bonnard who cast her in his film Tormento del passato, in which she played the character of Graziella.

Carrà made her debut as a recognized actress in 1960 in the film Long Night in 1943 and in 1963 I compagni directed by Mario Monicelli and starring Marcello Mastroianni. That same year she worked in the French film La chance et l'amour with Michel Piccoli. She then appeared in many Italian peplum films, including Fury of the Pagans (1960), Atlas in the Land of the Cyclops (1961), Mole Men Against the Son of Hercules (1961), Ulysses Against the Son of Hercules (1962), Pontius Pilate (1962) and Caesar the Conqueror (1962), as well as comedies and action films such as 5 marines per 100 ragazze (1961), The Terrorist (1963), The Organizer (1963), and La Celestina P... R... (1965).

In 1965, Carrà moved to Hollywood after signing a contract with 20th Century Fox and following in the footsteps of her fellow artists Gina Lollobrigida, Sophia Loren and Virna Lisi, Carrà appeared in the film Von Ryan's Express alongside Frank Sinatra, Edward Mulhare and Trevor Howard. In 1966, she guest starred in an episode of the American television series I Spy with Bill Cosby and Robert Culp. Feeling homesick and not liking life in Los Angeles, she decided to return to Italy that same year where she starred in several Italian and French films such as Le Saint prend l'affût (1966), the Our Man Flint parody Il vostro super agente Flit (1966), Why Did I Ever Say Yes Twice? (1969), and Cran d'arrêt (1970), as well as a few television shows.

On 3 March 1967, Carrà was broadcast on the National Program Tutto per bene, a TV adaptation of the novel of the same name by Luigi Pirandello.

In January 1968, she presented a special broadcast on the second national network, entitled Tempo di samba. In June of the same year, she participated in the play Processo di Famiglia, by Diego Fabbri and, at the end of the following year, she starred in Il sorriso della gioconda.

Changing her surname
In the mid-1960s the director Dante Guardamagna gave her the pseudonym Carrà; fond of painting, he combined her real name, Raffaella, which reminded him of the painter Raphael Sanzio, with the surname of the painter Carlo Carrà.

1970s: International success
In 1970 Carrà participated as a guest actress in the program  together with Nino Ferrer. Shortly after, Radiotelevisione italiana (RAI) hired her to present Canzonissima 70, a Saturday night show in which she was also an actress and dancer. She also presented Canzonissima 71 and Canzonissima 74 in which she released her hit single "Ma che musica Maestro". In 1971, she participated alongside Georges Descrières in the French-produced television series Arsenio Lupin, starring in the episode entitled La donna dai due sorrisi.

In 1974 she hosted on Rai Milleluci together with singer Mina Mazzini.

After her success on the Italian market, in 1975 Carrà made her first appearance in Spain on Televisión Española (TVE) when she performed in the variety show ; she subsequently released a compilation album with Spanish versions of her songs. In 1976, TVE hired her to host four episodes of the variety show .

During these years Carrà concentrated more on her singing career, achieving success in countries including Spain, Germany, France, Holland, Belgium, England, Greece, and in particular Latin American countries. One of her most resounding successes was the song A far l'amore comincia tu, the English version of which reached ninth place in the UK Singles Chart, besides obtaining several gold and platinum records worldwide.

In 1976 Carrà recorded the album Forte forte forte, which was released in 36 countries around the world, earning her a Gold certification in Canada'. The album was followed up in 1977 with Fiesta, which features Eurodisco songs; the title track has been described as "symbol" of the soubrette.

In 1978 Carrà was a guest on the Chilean programme Sábado gigante. That year she released the song "Hay que venir al sur", the Spanish version of "Tanti Auguri", and it was another of Carrà's greatest hits.

1980s: Return to RAI and success in Latin America
In 1980 she starred in the film Bárbara, shot in Argentina and distributed for the South American market and which was her last feature film as a leading actress. That same year she recorded the album Mi spendo tutto which features the song "Pedro", one of her biggest hits.

In 1981 she presented Millemilioni, which was the first experiment in international television cooperation: five specials, each filmed in a different capital: Buenos Aires, Mexico City, London, Rome and Moscow.

In 1982 she presented Fantastico 3 alongside Corrado, and sang the opening theme song, "Ballo ballo", a song that would be the focus of some controversy, as accused by some of plagiarising "Eleanor Rigby" by the Beatles.

Riding the wave of the success of Fantastico, the disc Raffaella Carrà 82 was released, it was arranged and composed, among others, by Franco Bracardi and Danilo Vaona, and written by Gianni Boncompagni, G. Belfiore, and Giancarlo Magalli. Later that year, Carrà appeared as the guest of honour at the Viña del Mar International Song Festival in Chile.

In February 1983, she was also a guest at the Sanremo Music Festival 1983. "Soli sulla luna" and "Ahi" written by Valsiglio - Peace – Depsa, are songs recorded specifically for the occasion, recorded – "in a hurry" – as stated by the same singer.

From 1983 to 1985, Carrà presented Pronto, Raffaella?, the first midday programme on Rai that cemented her role as a presenter as the show became a success, with more than 14 million viewers tuning in to watch her interview of Mother Teresa of Calcutta. Carrà also sang the theme song of the programme: Fatalità.

The success of Pronto, Raffaella? won her the title of "Female TV Personality at European Level" in 1984, awarded by the European TV Magazines Association. In 1984 she signed a two-year, multimillion-dollar contract with kitchen manufacturer Scavolini, with the slogan "the most loved by Italians". That same year, the renewal of the contract with RAI was at the center of a heated controversy with the then prime minister, Bettino Craxi, who called the amount that the conductor would have earned for an exclusive three years "immoral and scandalous". During this time, Carrà released the albums Fatalità (1983) and Bolero (1984).

In the 1985–86 television season she was the presenter of the supershow Buonasera Raffaella, the first ten episodes of which were broadcast from Rome, while the last five were broadcast live from the studios of the Rai Corporation in New York and thanks to Rai International, visible throughout North and South America. Raffaella also interviewed and duetted with illustrious guests such as Henry Kissinger, Joe Cocker, Riccardo Cocciante, Patty Pravo, Stevie Wonder, Ginger Rogers and Sammy Davis Jr. and sang the theme songs "Fidati!" and "Bellissimo". The opening and closing theme songs of the program are contained in the album Fidati!, released in the same year. The program put Carrà once again at the centre of controversy because of high production costs, especially for the episodes transmitted via satellite from the United States.
However, the transmission achieved great success, so much so as to arouse the interest of American televisions that invited Raffaella to the most famous talk shows of the time, interviewed by Johnny Carson, Ed Sullivan and David Letterman.

In the 1986–87 season, Carrà presented the programme conceived by Corrado in 1976 Domenica in, and sang both the opening theme song, "Curiosità", and the closing theme song, "Casa dolce casa". In November 1986, during a broadcast, Carrà reacted to an article published by the weekly scandal tabloid Novella 2000, threatening legal action against the newspaper, which had accused her of neglecting her dying mother. Raffaella's mother in fact died in 1987. Raffaella paid tribute during another episode of Domenica in, dedicating her song "I thank you life" to her.

In 1987 she struck a deal with Fininvest, with a multi-million dollar contract lasting two years. The first appearance on Canale 5 of Carrà dates back to 27 December 1987: on late evenings a special titled Benvenuta Raffaella was broadcast, and the Raffaella Carrà Show debuted shortly after on 9 January 1988. It was followed by Il principe azzurro, in the spring of 1989, which was the last program presented by Carrà for Canale 5.

1990s: Work as a presenter

Once the experience at Fininvest was over, Carrà hosted the new programme Weekend of Rafaella in which she appeared with a new mature look abandoning tights and bodysuits. The programme had a sequel entitled Ricomincio da due.

In early January 1990, Carrà returned to Rai to host her new show Raffaella Venerdì, Sabato e Domenica... E saranno famosi.

In June 1990, she co-hosted alongside Gigi Sabani, Ricardo Fernández Deu and Miriam Díaz Aroca, Cuando calienta el sol, a two-part Rai and TVE jointly produced variety show aired live from Saint-Vincent in Italy and Tossa de Mar in Spain and broadcast simultaneously to both countries.

In May 1991, she presented the Telegatto awards with Corrado.

Together with Johnny Dorelli, in 1991, she hosted the Saturday night show Fantastic 12 on Rai 1, which, despite controversy caused by Roberto Benigni's appearance, obtained ratings below expectations.

From 1992 to 1995 Carrà returned to TVE, conducting three seasons of ¡Hola Raffaella!, for which she won three TP de Oro and the early evening show A las 8 con Raffaella. In the 1994–95 season, she moved to the Spanish counterpart of Fininvest, Telecinco, with the afternoon program En casa con Raffaella.

At the end of 1995 she returned to Rai 1 with Carràmba! Che sorpresa. While in 1996 and from 1998 to 2000, she hosted Carràmba! Che sorpresa, Carrambà! Che fortuna, 40 minuti con Raffaella, Centoventitré and I Fantastici di Raffaella.

In 1997 she also participated as a protagonist in a four-part RAI miniseries entitled Unamamma per caso, directed by Sergio Martino, in which she played the role of a single journalist. It was her last appearance on a scripted TV series. That year refused to host the Sanremo Music Festival 1997.

She welcomed 1998 co-hosting with Ramón García the TVE broadcast of New Year's clock bell strikes live from Puerta del Sol in Madrid.

2000s: Between Spain and Italy
In 2000 she presented the Gran Premio Internazionale dello Spettacolo with Paolo Bonolis.

The following year, alongside Piero Chiambretti, Enrico Papi, Megan Gale and Massimo Ceccherini, she hosted the 51st edition of the Sanremo Music Festival, which didn't see a great amount of success. Carrà herself acknowledged that she was wrong to opt for a format that was more musical than television. After a break of about a year, Carrà returned to prime time on Rai 1 with the fourth edition of Carràmba! Che sorpresa. In 2004 she hosted the program Sogni,

On 19 December 2004 she co-hosted with Ramón García and Loles León the nine-hours telethon Contigo on TVE. On 24 October 2005, she was invited to Diego Maradona's program La Noche del 10 together with Robbie Williams. In the spring of 2006, Carrà hosted on Rai Amore, a replica of TVE's Contigo. It was dedicated to long-distance adoptions and it achieved nearly 150,000 adoptions.

Also in 2006, the actor , assisted by Roberto Mancinelli, dedicated her a book named Raffabook. Più che un libro uno show del sabato sera. Around the same time, Tiziano Ferro published in the album Nessuno è solo the song E Raffaella è mia, dedicated to Carrà, who participated in the videoclip of the song, while the Spanish singer Roser recorded the album Raffaella, a tribute with Carrà's greatest hits sung in Spanish. In December 2006 she appeared at the gala for TVE's 50th Anniversary.

On 30 November 2007 Raffica was released, two CDs and a DVD which collated all the theme songs sung and danced by Raffaella throughout her career.

In 2008 TVE called her for three programs related to the Eurovision Song Contest. The first was the selection process aired on 8 March Salvemos Eurovisión. She also presented two special galas related to this festival.

Shortly after, Carrà returned to Rai 1 to present a new edition of Carràmba! Che fortuna that was rewarded by the auditel, with an average of 5,000,000 daily viewers and a maximum of 6,000,000.

Subsequently, Carrà returned to Spain to host an episode of the Spanish version of Saturday Night Live on Cuatro in April 2009.

Also in 2008 the book Mito in tre minuti by Antimo Verde was published, an artistic biography based on research work. On 7 November of that year  Raffica – Balletti & Duetti was released, a second box set of two CDs and a DVD with a selection of television performances by Carrà.

That same year Carrà hosted and produced Il Gran Concerto, a television programme in which RAI National Symphony Orchestra performed pieces of classical music and opera.

2010s: Sporadic appearances

In 2010 she duetted with Renato Zero on the song Triangolo from his album Sei Zero. The two also shared the stage at Zero's concert, on 5 October of the same year.

In 2011, after 13 years of absence, Italy returned to participate in the Eurovision Song Contest, and Rai chose Carrà to host and comment from Italy on the final night of the event, as well as present the votes awarded by the jury and televoting. In the summer of 2011 French DJ Bob Sinclar remixed her classic song A far l'amore comincia tu, which was retitled Far l'amore. This remix was later included by Paolo Sorrentino in the soundtrack of his Academy awarded film The Great Beauty.

Later, together with Neri Marcorè, she starred in various TIM commercials, playing Queen Isabella I of Castile.  In October 2011, for the fourth consecutive year, she was once again the producer of the Rai 3 television program Il Gran Concerto, hosted by Alessandro Greco.

In January 2013, Carrà was meant to return, after ten years, to host the Saturday night show on Rai 1, but the programme, provisionally titled Auditorium was later cancelled. In February 2013 she became one of the coaches, along with Noemi, Piero Pelù and Riccardo Cocciante, in the program The Voice of Italy on Rai 2.

On 16 July 2013 she released the dance single Replay, which was followed up by the album Replay (The Album). The album was released on 19 November 2013, along with the second single Cha Cha Ciao, seventeen years after her previous studio album.

That same year she appeared as herself in the movie Colpi di fortuna directed by Neri Parenti. In 2014 she participated again in The Voice of Italy as a coach with Piero Pelù, Noemi and rapper J-Ax.

In February of the same year she was a guest at the first evening of the Sanremo Festival, where she performed a medley of songs from her latest album.

In the 2014–15 television season she returned to Rai 1 with a new talent-show with Joaquín Cortés, called Forte forte forte.

Starting from 24 February 2016 she returned as a coach in the Rai 2 program The Voice of Italy with Emis Killa, Max Pezzali and Dolcenera; during the final episode she announced that she would leave the program. On 19 December 2016 she hosted 60 años juntos, TVE's 60th Anniversary Gala. In the summer of 2017 she became a music producer for one of her contestants, Samuel Pietrasanta.

On 30 November 2018, the Christmas album Ogni volta che è Natale was released, Carrà's last release before her death. The album features an unreleased track, Chi l'ha detto, which was sent to radios on 16 November and released on YouTube along with the music video on 23 November. On late 2018 she returned to the television scene after two years of absence, as a guest of Fabio Fazio at Che tempo che fa and by Carlo Conti at Un Natale d'Oro Zecchino. In the spring of 2019 she returned to TV as the host of a program of interviews with well-known personalities from show business, culture and sports, titled A raccontare comincia tu, broadcast in prime time on Thursdays on Rai 3 for six weeks, from 4 April to 9 May. Following its success, the program was confirmed with a new cycle of four episodes, aired from 24 October to 4 November.

2020s
On 2 October 2020, the musical film Explota Explota was released in Spanish cinemas, it was directed by Uruguayan Nacho Álvarez, and it was based on Carrà's songs, she appears as a cameo. Since 25 January 2021, the film has been available in the Italian version (with the title Ballo Ballo) on the Amazon Prime digital platform. The film was nominated for three Goya Awards and three Feroz Awards.

On 5 July 2021, after Carrà's death, RAI director Stefano Coletta revealed on television that there were plans to ask Carrà to present the Eurovision Song Contest 2022 and the Sanremo Festival that same year.

Icon of women's liberation and the LGBT movement
On 13 November 1971, while hosting Canzonissima, she performed her new single Tuca Tuca wearing a top which showed her navel; she was the first woman to show it on Italian public television, at a time in which it was unusual for women to show their bodies. This event caused controversy in the conservative TV network RAI and was called "too provocative" by the Vatican newspaper L'Osservatore Romano.

She was a strong supporter of the LGBTQ+ community. She was awarded a "gay icon" award at the 2017 World Pride Madrid.

Personal life and death
Carrà had a ten-year relationship with the television author Gianni Boncompagni, author of her greatest musical hits. She later met , who was 9 years younger than her and at that time was the choreographer in two of her programs: Pronto, Raffaella? and Fantastico 3. Although they separated in the 1990s, they maintained a good personal and professional relationship to such an extent that it was he who announced Carrà's death in 2021. Previously, she had other romantic relationships with singer Little Tony whom she met in 1961 during the filming of the movie 5 marines per 100 ragazze, with Juventus footballer Gino Stacchini (which lasted eight years) and was also courted by Frank Sinatra, with whom she shared the set of the film Von Ryan's Express in 1965, but she rejected the flirting.

She never married. According to Carrà, she did not believe in marriage. She did not have children, although she wanted to; when she tried to have children, her doctor told her that she would not be able to. Instead, she decided to adopt several children from around the world from a distance.

Raffaella Carrà was very attached to Monte Argentario in Tuscany, where she lived for many years. Her villa in Cala Piccola was a source of inspiration for many of her broadcasts, even for the title of the TV program Carràmba! Che sorpresa. She was a big fan of football team Juventus.

Carrà died in Rome on 5 July 2021, at the age of 78, from lung cancer. Two days later, the funeral procession was held from her home, passing through RAI's central studios, the Foro Italico and Teatro delle Vittorie to reach the Capitolium, where the mortuary chapel was set up at Rome's City Hall. Carrà's ashes, after being cremated according to her expressed will, were taken to the places most dear to the artist, including Porto Santo Stefano and San Giovanni Rotondo, in the Sanctuary of Saint Pio of Pietrelcina.

Political views 
Carrà revealed in a 1977 interview that she was a communist. She said: "I always vote communist. On a struggle between workers and businessmen, I'll always be on the workers' side."

Honours
 Dame of the Order of Civil Merit, Spain. (1985)
 Medal of the Order of Civil Merit, Spain. (2018)

Discography

Filmography

Television
{|class="wikitable plainrowheaders" style="text-align:left"
|+Television roles showing year released, title, role played, network and notes
|-
!Year
!Title
!Role
!Network
!Notes
|-
|1962–63
!scope="row"|Il paroliere questo sconosciuto
|Herself/Co-host
|Rai 2
|Variety show
|-
|1964
!scope="row"|I grandi camaleonti
|Ortensia
|Rai 1
|Main role; 8 episodes
|-
|rowspan="2"|1965
!scope="row"|Lo stagno del diavolo
|Marie
|Rai 1
|Television film
|-
!scope="row"|Scaramouche
|Costanza De Mauriac
|Rai 1
|Guest role; 2 episodes
|-
|1966
!scope="row"|I Spy
|Sophia
|NBC
|Episode: "Sophia"
|-
|rowspan="2"|1967
!scope="row"|Del vento fra i rami del sassofono
|Pamela
|Rai 1
|Television film
|-
!scope="row"|Tutto per bene
|Palma Lori
|Rai 1
|Television film
|-
|rowspan="3"|1968
!scope="row"|Tempo di samba
|Herself/Co-host
|Rai 2
|Variety show
|-
!scope="row"|Processo di famiglia
|Bice
|Rai 1
|Television film
|-
!scope="row"|Idillio Villereccio
|Waitress
|TSI
|Television film
|-
|1969
!scope="row"|Il sorriso della Gioconda
|Doris Mead
|Rai 1
|Television film
|-
|1970
!scope="row"|Io, Agata e tu
|Herself/Co-host
|Rai 1
|Variety show
|-
|1970–75
!scope="row"|Canzonissima
|Herself/host
|Rai 1
|Variety/musical show (seasons 8–9, 12)
|-
|1971
!scope="row"|Arsène Lupin
|Antonina/ Carmela
|France 2
|Episode: "La femme aux deux sourires"
|-
|1974
!scope="row"|Milleluci
|Herself/Co-host
|Rai 1
|Variety show
|-
|1976
!scope="row"|La hora de… Raffaella Carrà
|Herself/host
|TVE1
|Variety show
|-
|1977
!scope="row"|Ekeines… ki ego
|Italian woman
|Yened
|Unknown episode
|-
|rowspan="2"|1978
!scope="row"|Ma che sera
|Herself/host
|Rai 1
|Variety show
|-
!scope="row"|Raffaella Show
|Herself/host
|Rai 1
|Variety show
|-
|1979
!scope="row"|Raffaella Carrà Show
|Herself/host
|RSI La 1
|Talk show
|-
|1981
!scope="row"|Millemilioni
|Herself/host
|Rai 2
|Musical program
|-
|1982–83
!scope="row"|Fantastico
|Herself/Co-host
|Rai 1
|Variety show (season 3)
|-
|rowspan="2"|1983
!scope="row"|Sanremo Music Festival 1983
|Herself/Guest
|Rai 1
|Annual music festival, performing "Soli sulla luna"
|-
!scope="row"|TG1
|Herself/Guest
|Rai 1
|Daily news program
|-
|1983–85
!scope="row"|Pronto, Raffaella?
|Herself/host
|Rai 1
|Variety/game show
|-
|1985–86
!scope="row"|Buonasera Raffaella
|Herself/host
|Rai 1
|Variety show
|-
|1986–87
!scope="row"|Domenica in
|Herself/host
|Rai 1
|Information program (season 11)
|-
|1987
!scope="row"|Benvenuta Raffaella
|Herself
|Canale 5
|Special
|-
|1988
!scope="row"|Raffaella Carrà Show|Herself/host
|Canale 5
|Variety show
|-
|1989
!scope="row"|Il principe azzurro|Herself/host
|Canale 5
|Game show
|-
|1990
!scope="row"|Raffaella Venerdì, Sabato e Domenica – Ricomincio da due|Herself/host
|Rai 2
|Variety show
|-
|1990–91
!scope="row"|Ricomincio da due|Herself/host
|Rai 2
|Variety show
|-
|1991–92
!scope="row"|Fantastico|Herself/host
|Rai 1
|Variety show (season 12)
|-
|1992–94
!scope="row"|¡Hola Raffaella!|Herself/host
|TVE1
|Spanish version of Pronto, Raffaella?|-
|1993–94
!scope="row"|A las 8 con Raffaella|Herself/host
|TVE1
|Talk show
|-
|1995
!scope="row"|En casa con Raffaella|Herself/host
|Telecinco
|Variety show
|-
|1995–20022008–09
!scope="row"|Carràmba! Che sorpresa|Herself/host
|Rai 1
|Italian version of Surprise Surprise|-
|1996–97
!scope="row"|40 minuti con Raffaella|Herself/host
|Rai 1
|Talk show
|-
|1997
!scope="row"|Mamma per caso|Nicoletta Brizzi
|Rai 1
|Miniseries
|-
|1997–98
!scope="row"|Campanadas|Herself/host
|TVE1
|New Year's special
|-
|1998–99
!scope="row"|Centoventitré|Herself/host
|Rai 1
|Game show
|-
|1999
!scope="row"|I fantastici di Raffaella|Herself/host
|Rai 1
|Variety show
|-
|2001
!scope="row"|Sanremo Music Festival 2001|Herself/host
|Rai 1
|Annual music festival
|-
|rowspan="2"|2004
!scope="row"|Contigo|Herself/host
|TVE1
|Telethon
|-
!scope="row"|Sogni|Herself/host
|Rai 1
|Reality show
|-
|2005
!scope="row"|Raffaella Hoy|Herself/host
|El Trece
|Variety show
|-
|2006
!scope="row"|Amore|Herself/host
|Rai 1
|Italian version of Contigo|-
|2008
!scope="row"|Salvemos Eurovisión|Herself/host
|La 1
|Eurovision Spanish National Final
|-
|2009
!scope="row"|Saturday Night Live|Herself/Guest host
|Cuatro
|Episode: "Raffaella Carrà"
|-
|2011
!scope="row"|Eurovision Song Contest 2011|Herself/ Commentator
|Rai 5
|Annual music festival
|-
|2013–16
!scope="row"|The Voice of Italy|Herself/Coach
|Rai 2
|Talent show (seasons 1–2, 4)
|-
|2014
!scope="row"|Sanremo Music Festival 2014|Herself/Guest
|Rai 1
|Annual music festival
|-
|2015
!scope="row"|Forte Forte Forte|Herself/Judge
|Rai 1
|Talent show (also co-creator)
|-
|2019
!scope="row"|A raccontare comincia tu|Herself/host
|Rai 3
|Talk show
|-
!colspan=5|Sources:
|}

Mass media references
 In the tenth episode of the fourteenth season of Doctor Who, in a monitor transmitting entertainment programmes for travellers, a videoclip of Raffaella Carrà singing "Do it, Do it Again" (English version of "A far l'amore comincia tu") can be seen. Later in the same episode, when the light goes off in the vehicle, the audio track from the same videoclip can be heard in the background. 
 In the British documentary "Television" on the fiftieth anniversary of the BBC, a song from one of Raffaella Carrà's shows acts as an example for new generation's morning shows.
 This would later be followed by a Night of 1000 Raffaella's runway on the seventh episode of the second season of Drag Race España.

References

External links

 
 
 
 Raffaella Carrà at MSN Movies

1943 births
2021 deaths
20th-century Italian actresses
Columbia Records artists
Deaths from lung cancer in Lazio
Eurodisco musicians
Italian child actresses
Italian communists
Italian dance musicians
Italian women singers
Italian Roman Catholics
Italian television presenters
Italian women television presenters
Italian LGBT rights activists
Musicians from Bologna
People of Sicilian descent
Spanish-language singers of Italy
Order of Civil Merit members